Kalevalsky District is an administrative district (raion), one of the fifteen in the Republic of Karelia, Russia. It is located in the northwest of the republic and borders with Finland in the west, Loukhsky District in the north, Kemsky and Muyezersky Districts in the east, and with the territory of the town of republic significance of Kostomuksha in the south. Its administrative center is the urban locality (an urban-type settlement) of Kalevala. As of the 2010 Census, the total population of the district was 8,321, with the population of Kalevala accounting for 54.4% of that number.

Geography
There are many lakes within the district, and wetlands account for 30% of the district's territory. Natural resources include molybdenum, iron ore, quartzite, copper, and peat.

Administrative and municipal status
Within the framework of administrative divisions, Kalevalsky District is one of the fifteen in the Republic of Karelia and has administrative jurisdiction over one urban-type settlement (Kalevala) and eight rural localities. As a municipal division, the district is incorporated as Kalevalsky Municipal District. The urban-type settlement of Kalevala and one rural locality (the settlement of Kuusiniemi) are incorporated into an urban settlement, while the remaining seven rural localities are incorporated into three rural settlements within the municipal district. The urban-type settlement of Kalevala serves as the administrative center of both the administrative and municipal district.

Demographics 

As of the 2002 Census, the district's ethnic composition was as follows:
Russians: 46.3%
Karelians: 35.9%
Belarusians: 9.8%
Ukrainians: 3.2%
Other ethnicities: 4.7%

References

Notes

Sources

Districts of the Republic of Karelia